Keeping Score may refer to:
 Baseball scorekeeping
 Keeping Score (classical music), the San Francisco Symphony's accessibility program for classical music
 Keeping Score (TV series), a documentary series featuring American soccer players
 Keeping Score (L D R U song)
 Keeping Score (Dan + Shay song)